Bryan Robert Niven (born April 21, 1979) is an American artist and photographer, known for his surrealistic and color saturated images displaying families and individuals in a caricaturistic style. Niven currently resides in Provo, Utah with his wife and three children.

Career

Apple has involved Niven in various projects including presentations at the Apple Store in Soho, New York, and as a contributing author for "Apple Pro" on apple.com. International exposure followed Niven after he photographed Rancid drummer Branden Steineckert in 2007. Niven's image of Steineckert debuted a few months later during a presentation of Aperture that Niven gave for Apple, in New York City. Further International exposure came after Niven's work was featured in a four page article "The American Dream in Technicolour", in the UK based magazine, Digital Photographer.

Adobe has also worked with Niven, licensing some of his images for use with their on-going Pop-Up Stores, detailed on Adobe's Blog, involving their photo-editing software Adobe Photoshop. Other collaborations include companies such as CNET and their Gotham, Hands-On Holiday Guide, event in New York City. In 2009 Niven was showcased as a VIP photographer for Dynalite Inc.,  joining a list of well known, and well established photographers, (much his senior), such as Michael Grecco, Vincent Versace, Nick Vedros, Jack Reznicki, Joe DiMaggio, Nancy Brown, and Lynn Goldsmith. Dynalite has since featured Niven's work in well known photography magazines such as PDN, and Shutterbug. Dynalite uses Niven's work to advertise their lightweight studio lighting, "road series" and ring flash units. Niven's work has been used in national product-leaflets for Dynalite as well, in photography stores, including New York based B&H Photo Video.

Niven manages several blogs and websites, consisting of commercial and personal blogs, web galleries, photography courses, and YouTube outlets featuring his behind-the-scenes-videos of his productions. Some of Niven's websites appear to have been earlier blogs and websites, which now direct followers to new addresses. According to a recent entry in one of Niven's own blogs he continues to stay busy with projects including another internationally reaching project, taking him to Jerusalem.

Notable subjects
Mo Rocca (comedian)
Jeff Coffin (two-time Grammy-winning member of Bela Fleck and the Flecktones)
Jordan Mendenhall (pro snowboarder)
Dave Samuels (Grammy-winning member of the Caribbean Jazz Project)
Branden Steineckert (current drummer for Rancid and founding member of The Used)
Nick Rimando (pro soccer player)

References

External links
Official Site
Blog
Camera Smarts
Reality Shoot 
former blog

1979 births
Living people
American photographers
Artists from California
Artists from Provo, Utah